Rio Algom was a mining corporation that was purchased by Billiton in 2000 and is now part of BHP.

Uranium 

It operated many uranium mines and mills in the Elliot Lake region of Ontario, Canada, including the Lacnor Mine, Nordic Mine, Panel Mine, Pronto Mine, Quirke Mine, Milliken Mine,  Stanleigh Mine, and the Spanish-American Mine. These operated from the 1950s to the 1990s.

It got ownership of a uranium mill in the Ambrosia Lake region of New Mexico when it purchased the Quivira Mining Corporation from Kerr-McGee in 1989. The mill had only been active from 1958-1985. However from 1989-2002 it produced uranium from recovered mine-water.

The 2017 performance of Rio Algom, who own nine decommissioned uranium mines at Elliot Lake, was described as "below expectations" by the Canadian Nuclear Safety Commission. The commission reported radium releases above limits at the Stanleigh effluent treatment plant, prompting engineering work plus increased site monitoring by Rio Algom.

Mergers and acquisitions 
Rio Algom bought the Quivira Mining Corporation (a subsidiary of Kerr-McGee) in 1989.

Rio Algom was bought by Billiton in 2000.

Notes

See also 
Denison Mines

BHP
Uranium mining companies of Canada